Joseph Anthony Casello is a Democratic member of the Florida Legislature representing the State's 90th House district. He resides in Boynton Beach, Florida, where he acted as City Commissioner from March 12, 2013, to November 7, 2018.

Political career
Casello's first entry into politics was in 2013, where he ran in a close election for City Commissioner, winning the seat by only 3 votes in a run-off election. After 5 years of serving in that position, he decided to run for election in Florida's 90th district. Casello was elected unopposed to the Florida House of Representatives on November 6, 2018 from the platform of Democratic Party.

Personal life
He has a wife, Josephine, with whom he shares a daughter.

References

Casello, Joseph
Living people
21st-century American politicians
1952 births